Prototyphis gracilis is a species of sea snail, a marine gastropod mollusk in the family Muricidae, the murex snails or rock snails.

Description
The length of the shell attains  23.5 mm.

Distribution
This marine species occurs off the Fiji Islands.

References

 Houart, R.; Héros, V. (2008). Muricidae (Mollusca: Gastropoda) from Fiji and Tonga. in: Héros, V. et al. (Ed.) Tropical Deep-Sea Benthos 25. Mémoires du Muséum national d'Histoire naturelle (1993). 196: 437-480
 Merle D., Garrigues B. & Pointier J.-P. (2011) Fossil and Recent Muricidae of the world. Part Muricinae. Hackenheim: Conchbooks. 648 pp

External links
  Houart, R.; Héros, V. (2012). New species of Muricidae (Gastropoda) and additional or noteworthy records from the western Pacific. Zoosystema. 34(1), 21-37

Muricidae
Gastropods described in 2008